Celeste D’Arcángelo (born 7 July 2003) is an Argentine rhythmic gymnast known for being the first Argentinian in this discipline to qualify at the Olympic Games, in this case, the Youth of Buenos Aires 2018. She is also an eight-time national champion.

Personal life 
Celeste D'Arcángelo is the youngest of four brothers and sisters, one of them being Hernán D'Arcángelo, a medalist at the 2011 Pan American Games in squash. She took up gymnastics at age four in Córdoba after having tried many sports. Her sport ambitions are to compete at the Olympic Games and World Championships. After the end of her competitive career D’Arcángelo aspires to study accounting or law at university.

Career

Junior 
D'Arcangelo began training at Córdoba Athletic at the age of four, until that activity at the sports center was closed. After that, being interested in sports, she joined the Club Municipalidad de Córdoba, where she was able to train with Silvina Márquez, Sandra Ré, Anahí Sosa, Antonella Yacobelli, Laura Arribas and Vanina Lorefice (her current coach). At the age of 9, she participated in her first South American Championship in the pre-child category.

In 2017 she was selected for Pan American Championship in Daytona Beach, qualifying for the hoop final where she ended up 6th.

She participated in the 2018 Pan American Junior Championship, in Medellín, where she was 5th in the All Around, 5th in the team competition along with Candela Urso, Martina Hadrowa and Karema Jara, and went on to three apparatus finals. In addition, this tournament gave her the pass for the 2018 Youth Olympic Games, in Buenos Aires, where she became the first Argentine rhythmic gymnast to qualify for an Olympic Games.

At the 2018 Youth Olympic Games she placed 29th in the rankings and fourth in the mixed multidisciplinary team event, she was also the youngest of the Argentine delegation that participated in the multidisciplinary event.

Senior 
D'Arcangelo debuted in the World Cup circuit in Pesaro in 2019  and she then competed at the Lima Pan American Games, where she placed 8th in the ball final and 14th in the All-Around. In 2021, she took part to the 2021 Pan American Rhythmic Gymnastics Championships, in Rio de Janeiro, where she finished 13th in the All-Around, she was also 7th in the clubs final, and 4th with the team, along with Sol Fainberg, Candela Urso and Martina Gil.

In 2022 she competed in the World Cups in Pamplona and Baku, finishing mid ranking and not qualifying for finals. She competed in the 2022 Pan American Gymnastics Championships in Rio de Janeiro, where she placed 13th overall, and fifth in the team with Martina Gil and Sol Martinez Fainberg. In October, she participated in the 2022 South American Games in Asuncion, Paraguay, where she was fifth in the individual overall final, eighth in the club final, and won the bronze medal in the ribbon final. In December she participated in the 2022 South American Rhythmic Gymnastics Championships in Paipa, Colombia where she won bronze in the all-around behind the two Brazilians Barbara Domingos and Geovanna Santos, and also won silver for teams and in the ball and ribbon final and gold in the club final.

Routine music information

References 

2003 births
21st-century Argentine women
Argentine rhythmic gymnasts
Living people
Gymnasts at the 2018 Summer Youth Olympics
South American Games bronze medalists for Argentina
South American Games medalists in gymnastics